Abramo may refer to:

Abramo, La Pampa, village and rural locality in Argentina
Abramo (given name)
Abramo (surname)

See also
Abrama, town in Gujarat, India